The 41st National Film Awards was presented on 8 July 2018 by the Ministry of Information, Bangladesh to felicitate the best of Bangladeshi films released in the calendar year 2016.

List of winners

References

External links

National Film Awards (Bangladesh) ceremonies
2016 film awards
2018 awards in Bangladesh
July 2018 events in Bangladesh
2018 in Dhaka